Răzvan Petcu (born May 10, 1973) is a retired freestyle and butterfly swimmer from Romania, who represented his native country at the 1996 Summer Olympics in Atlanta, Georgia. He is best known for winning the bronze medal in the men's 4×100 m freestyle relay event at the 1995 FINA Short Course World Championships in Rio de Janeiro. He now lives in Charlotte, North Carolina.

References
 sports-reference

1973 births
Living people
Romanian male butterfly swimmers
Olympic swimmers of Romania
Swimmers at the 1996 Summer Olympics
Romanian male freestyle swimmers
Medalists at the FINA World Swimming Championships (25 m)